Vice-Admiral Robert Hall,  (1817 – 11 June 1882) was a Royal Navy officer who served as Third Lord and Controller of the Navy.

Early life
He was the natural son of Sir Robert Hall (1778-1818), a naval officer,  and Miss Mary Ann Edwards.

Naval career
Hall joined the Royal Navy in 1833. Promoted to captain in 1855, he commanded HMS Gladiator in the Sea of Azov and HMS Miranda in the Black sea during the Crimean War. He was then given command of HMS Termagant.

He was appointed Private Secretary to the Duke of Somerset (First Lord of the Admiralty) in 1863, Superintendent of Pembroke dockyard in 1866 and Third Lord and Controller of the Navy in 1871. He was afterwards Naval Secretary of the Admiralty from 1872 to 1882 and acting Permanent Secretary to the Admiralty in 1882 in the absence of the incumbent.

Hall was laid to rest in the secular cemetery of Mount St Bernard Abbey, Leicestershire.

See also

References

External links
Robert Hall at The Dreadnought Project.

1817 births
1882 deaths
Companions of the Order of the Bath
Royal Navy officers
Permanent Secretaries to the Admiralty
Lords of the Admiralty
Burials in Leicestershire